The Ideal Ice Cream is an ice cream manufacturing company based in Mangalore, India. It was started on 1 May 1975 by Prabhakar Kamath, and is the biggest ice cream manufacturer in Mangalore with an 80% market share. It has several outlets in and around Mangalore and supply chains across Goa, Karnataka and northern Kerala. The brand's signature dish is the Gadbad, a tall glass with layers of ice-cream, jelly, dry-fruits and fresh fruits. The brand has won several accolades through the years.

Pabbas in MG Road, Mangalore is an outlet belonging to this company.

See also 
 Economy of Mangalore
 Pabbas

References

External sources
 Official Website

Privately held companies of India
Food and drink companies established in 1975
Ice cream brands
Companies based in Mangalore
1975 establishments in Karnataka